Middleton Island Air Force Station (AAC ID: F-22) is a closed United States Air Force General Surveillance Radar station.

History
Middleton Island AFS was a continental defence radar station constructed to provide the United States Air Force early warning of an attack by the Soviet Union on Alaska.

The station was constructed on Middleton Island, an isolated island about  miles long and 1/2 mile wide in the Gulf of Alaska.  Unlike the other AC&W stations in Alaska, the extreme arctic cold was moderated by the Pacific Ocean water and did not fall to sub-freezing levels.    The weather, however, was frequently overcast and heavy rain and wind were common.

Plans were made for a permanent radar site beginning in late 1956.  In 1957, the island was transferred from the jurisdiction of the Bureau of Land Management to the Department of Defense for construction of the station.  A dock facility was initially constructed which allowed Naval LSTs and barges to land construction equipment and material on the island, and several gravel roads were constructed to the several construction sites.   In addition, an airstrip was constructed on the island, allowing cargo transports and personnel to fly in and out.

With the relative moderate climate on Middleton Island, the buildings were not all connected by hallways.  However, as with all remote AC&W sites in Alaska, tours at the station were limited to one year because of the psychological strain and physical hardships.

The 720th Aircraft Control and Warning Squadron was assigned to the station in May 1958 and operated AN/FPS-3, AN/FPS-6, AN/FPS-8, and AN/FPS-4 radars.  As a surveillance station,  its mission was to monitor the airspace for aircraft activity and  provide information 24/7 to the air defense Direction Center at Fire Island AFS near Anchorage, where it was analyzed to determine range, direction, altitude, speed, and whether aircraft were friendly or hostile.

The Alaskan Air Command, after investigating various options, constructed a White Alice Communications System communications site at the station, operated by the Air Force Communications Service (AFCS). The Middleton Island  site was activated in 1958.

Middleton Island  Air Force Station was very expensive to maintain, and was inactivated due to budget reductions on 15 May 1963, its mission being taken over by other AAC surveillance radar sites with upgraded and more capable equipment.

Today the site remains abandoned and deteriorating.   Photography of the island shows abandoned buildings, radar towers and communications antennas, all in a highly deteriorated state.

Air Force units and assignments 

Units:
 720th Aircraft Control and Warning Squadron, Activated 8 September 1955
 Inactivated 1 October 1963

Assignments:
 10th Air Division, 8 September 1955
 5039th Aircraft Control and Warning Group, 1 June 1957
 5040th Aircraft Control and Warning Group, 1 November 1959
 5070th Air Defense Wing, 1 August 1960 – 1 October 1969

See also
 Alaskan Air Command

References

 Alaskan Air Defenses
 Middleton Island, AK

Radar stations of the United States Air Force
Installations of the United States Air Force in Alaska
1958 establishments in Alaska
1963 disestablishments in Alaska
Military installations established in 1958
Military installations closed in 1963